Damir Milačić (born 25 February 1975) is a Croatian professional basketball coach and former player who is currently the head coach of Šibenka of the Croatian League.

Standing at 1.84 m (6 ft 0 in), he used to play as point guard in his career. In 2012, Milačić turned to coaching as he started coaching Alkar. He also played with the senior men's Croatia national team.

References

1975 births
Croatian men's basketball players
Croatian basketball coaches
KK Zadar players
KK Zagreb players
KK Cedevita players
Spirou Charleroi players
Antwerp Giants players
KK Olimpija players
Kangoeroes Basket Mechelen coaches
Living people
Point guards
KK Alkar players